The Cabinet of Tryggvi Þórhallsson was formed 28 August 1927.

Cabinets

Inaugural cabinet

Change (8 December 1928)

Change (7 March 1929)

Change (20 April 1931)

Change (20 August 1931)

See also 

1927 establishments in Iceland
1932 disestablishments in Iceland
Tryggvi Thorhallsson, Cabinet of
Cabinets established in 1927
Cabinets disestablished in 1932
Progressive Party (Iceland)